The Drowner (1996) is a novel by Australian author Robert Drewe. It was shortlisted for Miles Franklin Award, and won the Vance Palmer Prize for Fiction and New South Wales Premier's Literary Awards — Book of the Year in 1997.

Plot summary

In the late 19th century an Englishman irrigator or "drowner", Will Dance, utilises ancient water-knowledge and modern technology to save a drought-ridden town in Western Australia.

Reviews

 Publishers' Weekly noted: "The desert mining town,..., comes fully to life, invigorated by crisp and moving portrayals of Drewe's minor characters and the monotonous beauty of the hostile (blessedly arid) countryside."  
 Garth Crawford in Woroni Sstated: "In his mastery of image, and spare but beautiful descriptions of this quest, Drewe reveals his strongest claim to pre-eminence. The Drowner is by an author who enjoys words, weighs and places each without mistaking linguistic asceticism for aestheticism."

Awards and nominations

 1997 winner New South Wales Premier's Literary Awards — Christina Stead Prize for Fiction 
 1997 winner New South Wales Premier's Literary Awards — Book of the Year 
 1997 shortlisted Commonwealth Writer's Prize — South East Asia and South Pacific Region - Best First Novel 
 1997 winner Vance Palmer Prize for Fiction
 1998 winner Festival Awards for Literature (SA) — Award for Fiction — National Fiction Award 
 1998 winner Festival Awards for Literature (SA) — Premier's Award for the Best Overall Published Work

Notes
A film adaptation of the novel is currently in pre-production. Directed by Jeff Darling from a screenplay by Justin Monjo, Producers Michael Boughen and Matthew Street, Production Company: Ambience Entertainment  The Drowner: A story of love, passion, madness, death, and human frailty]</ref>

References

1996 Australian novels
Pan Books books